Comendador is the capital of the Elías Piña province of the Dominican Republic. It has a border crossing to the Haitian town Belladère.

Population
The municipality had, in 2012, a total population of 43,894. In this numbers are included the population of the municipal district Sabana Larga.

History
The city was named after its founder, the "Comendador of Lares" (Comendador was the chief of a military or religious order) but on 29 November 1930 it was changed to Elías Piña. By the Law 342 of 29 May 1972 the city was named again Comendador.

Economy
The main economic activity of the municipality is agriculture.

References

Populated places in Elías Piña Province
Municipalities of the Dominican Republic
Dominican Republic–Haiti border crossings